Christoph Bantzer (born 4 January 1936 in Marburg) is a German television actor.

His younger brother Claus Bantzer is a composer and musician.

Life and work 
Christoph Bantzer born on 4 January 1936 in Marburg in a family of artists (both father and grandfather were painters). His younger brother Claus Bantzer is a musician and composer.

Bantzer studied acting at the Berlin University of the Arts.

His focus is the theater spectacle; he played in many important German-language theaters, such as Schiller Theater, Zürich playhouse or the Burgtheater. From 1972 to 1977 he was a member of Christoph Bantzer Deutsches Schauspielhaus in Hamburg. Since 1985 - the beginning of Jürgen Flimm's directorship - Bantzer belongs to the Thalia Theater in Hamburg.

In addition to his theater engagements, Bantzer works with many films, mainly these are television productions. As speaker, he can be heard on an audio book series and also in dubbed films.

Selected filmography
  (1963, TV play), as Louis Dubedat
  (1968, TV play), as Biff Loman
  (1970), as Andreas
  (1971, TV miniseries), as Walter Hartright
 Die Dämonen (1977, TV miniseries), as Nikolai Stavrogin
  (1978, TV film), as Heinrich Heine
  (1982, TV miniseries), as Mozart
  (1990, TV film), as Egon Krenz
 Funny Games (1997), as Fred

External links 
 
 Alexander Agency Munich 

1936 births
Living people
People from Marburg
German male stage actors
German male television actors
People from Hesse-Nassau
20th-century German male actors
21st-century German male actors